Sir Nicholas John Patten (born 7 August 1950) is a former member of the Court of Appeal of England and Wales.

Education
Tulse Hill Comprehensive School for boys; Christ Church, Oxford.

Career
Patten was called to the bar (Lincoln's Inn) in 1974 and made a Bencher in 1997. He became a Queen's Counsel in 1988. He was appointed a Deputy High Court judge in 1998. On 2 October 2000, he was appointed to the High Court of Justice, receiving the customary knighthood, and was assigned to the Chancery Division. He served as Vice-Chancellor of the County Palatine of Lancaster from 2005 to 2008. On 8 June 2009, Patten became a Lord Justice of Appeal, and received the customary appointment to the Privy Council the same year. He retired on 8 August 2020, having reached the statutory retirement age for judges.

See also
 List of Lords Justices of Appeal

References

1950 births
Living people
Alumni of Christ Church, Oxford
British King's Counsel
Chancery Division judges
Knights Bachelor
Members of the Privy Council of the United Kingdom
Lords Justices of Appeal